Raymond Hervey Jolliffe, 5th Baron Hylton, ARICS, DL (born 13 June 1932), is a British peer and landowner. He is one of 92 hereditary peers elected to remain in the House of Lords after the passing of the House of Lords Act 1999, sitting as a crossbencher. He is currently the longest-serving Crossbench member of the House of Lords.

Early life
He is the elder son of the 4th Baron Hylton and Lady Perdita Rose Mary Asquith (1910–1996; daughter of Katharine and Raymond Asquith, and sister of Julian Asquith, 2nd Earl of Oxford and Asquith, and thus the granddaughter of former Prime Minister H. H. Asquith). He was educated at Eton College in Berkshire and Trinity College, Oxford, where he graduated with a Master of Arts in History in 1955. In 1951 and 1952, he served in the Coldstream Guards, and in 1967, he succeeded to his father's title.

Career
Jolliffe was Assistant Private Secretary to the Governor-General of Canada between 1960 and 1962. Since 1962, he was member of the Abbeyfield Society, the Catholic Housing Aid Society, the London Housing Aid Centre, the National Federation of Housing Associations, Mencap, the Foundation for Alternatives, the Hugh of Witham Foundation, and the Action around Bethlehem Children with Disability (ABCD). He has worked for Age Concern, L'Arche Ltd as well as the Mendip Wansdyke Local Enterprise Group. Since 1988, he is further president of the Northern Ireland Association for Care and Resettlement of Offenders. He is a member of the Housing Associations Charitable Trust and of Forward Thinking.

As a member of the House of Lords, he has worked to promote peace talks in the Middle East and Ireland amongst other work. He once stated that he regretted "very much that the fine old English and French word ‘gay’ has, in my lifetime, been appropriated by a small but vocal minority of the population. The result is that it can no longer be used in its original and rather delightful meaning."

Philanthropy
Hylton is a trustee of the Acorn Christian Healing Trust and vice-chairman of Partners in Hope. From 1993 to 2001, he was chairman of the St Francis and St Sergius Trust Fund. He is also a  trustee and governor of the Ammerdown Study Centre at Ammerdown House, Kilmersdon, near Bath, which remains the family seat. In 1960 he was appointed an Associate of Royal Institution of Chartered Surveyors and in 1994, he received an honorary doctorate of the University of Southampton.

Personal life
Since 1966, he has been married to Joanna de Bertodano, granddaughter of the 6th Earl of Mexborough. They have a daughter and four sons:
Hon. William Henry Martin Jolliffe (1 April 1967), heir apparent
Hon. Andrew Thomas Peter Jolliffe (29 June 1969 – 24 October 2022)
Hon. Alexander John Charles Martin Jolliffe (10 February 1973)
Hon. Emily Sylvia Rose Elizabeth Jolliffe (14 March 1975)
Hon. John Edward Arthur Jolliffe (7 December 1977)

References

1932 births
Alumni of Trinity College, Oxford
Barons in the Peerage of the United Kingdom
Crossbench hereditary peers
Deputy Lieutenants of Somerset
Living people
Coldstream Guards officers
People educated at Eton College
Asquith family
Raymond
Eldest sons of British hereditary barons
Hereditary peers elected under the House of Lords Act 1999